Sir Robert Jenkinson (1720 – 1766) was the 5th baronet Jenkinson of Walcot and Hawkesbury.

Early life and education
The son of Sir Banks Jenkinson, 4th Baronet, and Catherine Dashwood. Jenkinson was baptised on 13 August 1720 at Charlbury. He was educated at John Roysse's Free School in Abingdon, (now Abingdon School) and later St John's College, Oxford and was awarded an Honorary Master of Arts degree; matriculated 31 May 1738 aged 17.

Career
He earned a Doctor of Civil Law on 17 April 1749 but it is unknown if he practiced. He was a Steward of the OA Club in 1748.

Peerage
He succeeded his father Sir Banks Jenkinson, 4th Baronet, to the title on 2 July 1738. He married Mary Cope but did not have any children. He died on 8 August 1766, aged 46 and was succeeded by Sir Banks Jenkinson, 6th Baronet. He was buried on 12 August at Hawkesbury, Gloucestershire.

See also
 List of Old Abingdonians

References

1720 births
1766 deaths
People educated at Abingdon School
Alumni of St John's College, Oxford
Baronets in the Baronetage of England